Judith Draxler (born March 24, 1970 in Feldbach, Steiermark) is a retired freestyle swimmer from Austria, who competed in three consecutive Summer Olympics for her native country, starting in 1996.

References
  Austrian Olympic Committee

1970 births
Living people
Austrian female freestyle swimmers
Olympic swimmers of Austria
Swimmers at the 1996 Summer Olympics
Swimmers at the 2000 Summer Olympics
Swimmers at the 2004 Summer Olympics